Bryx analicarens (pink pipefish) is a species of marine fish of the family Syngnathidae. This species is ovoviviparous, with the males carrying eggs in a brood pouch until they hatch.

References

Further reading
World Register of Marine Species

analicarens
Marine fish
Fish described in 1915